Leroy, also Leeroy, LeeRoy, Lee Roy, LeRoy or Le Roy, is both a male given name and a family name of Norman origin. Leroy [lørwa] is one of the most common surnames in northern France. This family name originated from the Normans, the descendants of Norse Vikings from Denmark, Norway and Iceland who later migrated to Normandy. The derivation is from le roy, meaning "the king". The Normans brought this surname to England, which in medieval times was used as a nickname either for one who behaved in a regal fashion, or who had earned the title in some contest of skill. "Le Roy le veult" ("The King wills it"), is a Norman French phrase still used in the Parliament of the United Kingdom to this day as royal assent.

Given name
Leroy (musician), American musician
Leroy Anderson, American composer
Archbishop LeRoy Bailey, Jr., senior pastor of The First Cathedral, Bloomfield, Connecticut
Leroy Brown (athlete), Olympic medal-winning American athlete
Leroy Brown (wrestler), a ring name of professional wrestler Roland Daniels
Leroy "Shaq" Buchanan (born 1997), American basketball player in the Israeli Basketball Premier League
Leroy Burrell, American athlete
Leroy Carr, blues singer and pianist
Leroy Cooper, American astronaut
Leroy D'Sa (born 1953), Indian badminton player and coach
LeRoy Edwards, American professional basketball pioneer
"Baby Face" Leroy Foster, Chicago blues musician
Leroy George, Dutch footballer
Leroy Griffiths, professional footballer 
Leroy Grumman, American aircraft designer and industrialist 
LeRoy Hurd, American basketball player
Leroy Jenkins (jazz musician), jazz musician
Leroy Jenkins (televangelist),  American televangelist
Leroy Jetta, professional Australian rules footballer
Leroy S. Johnson, leader of the polygamist denomination of FLDS
Leroy Lita, Congolese-born English footballer
Leroy Nash, American criminal
LeRoy Neiman, American artist
Leroy Robert "Satchel" Paige, American professional baseball player
Leroy Rosenior, English footballer and coach
Leroy Sané, German footballer
Lee Roy Selmon, former NFL football defensive lineman 
Leeroy Stagger, Canadian alternative country singer-songwriter
Leeroy Thornhill, British electronic music artist
Leroy Van Dyke, American singer
Leroy A. Wilson, American businessman
Leroy Wright, American professional basketball player
LeeRoy Yarbrough, NASCAR racer

Surname
Adolphe Leroy, French entrepreneur, co-founder of Leroy Merlin
Adrian Le Roy (c.1520–1598), French lutenist, guitarist, and composer
Adrien Leroy (born 1981), French chess player and poet
Ali LeRoi (born 1962), American television producer and writer
Alphonse Leroy (engraver) (1820–1902), French engraver
Alphonse Leroy (physician) (1742–1816), French physician and obstetrician
Amélie Claire Leroy (1851–1934), English writer, pen-name Esmè Stuart
André Leroy (1801–1875), French botanist
Catherine Leroy (1945–2006), French war photojournalist
Charles-Georges Le Roy (1723–1789), French man of letters 
Claude Le Roy (born 1948), a French football manager and former player
Edouard Le Roy (1870–1954), French philosopher
Edward Webster Le Roy (1874–1940), American politician and newspaper editor
Eugène Le Roy (1836–1907), French novelist
Jean-François Leroy (1729–1791), French architect
Jennifer LeRoy (born 1974), American model and actress
Jérôme Leroy (composer) (born 1981), French composer
Jérôme Leroy (footballer) (born 1974), French footballer
JT LeRoy, a literary persona created by American writer Laura Albert
Jules Leroy (1903–1979), French priest and researcher
Julien Le Roy (1686–1759), French clock- and watch-maker
Julien-David Le Roy (1724–1803), French architect and archaeologist, son of Julien
Laurent Leroy (born 1976), French footballer
Maxime Leroy (1873–1957), French jurist and social historian
Mervyn LeRoy (1900–1987), American actor and director
Oswald Leroy (born 1936),  Belgian mathematician, acousto-optics theorist
Nolwenn Leroy (born 1982), French singer
Pierre Le Roy (1717–1785), French clockmaker, son of Julien 
Robert LeRoy (1885–1946), American tennis player
Roland Leroy (born 1926), French politician
William E. Le Roy (1818–1888), United States Navy admiral
Xavier Leroy (born 1968), French computer scientist and programmer

Fictional characters
"Bad, Bad Leroy Brown", protagonist of a song by Jim Croce
"Leroy Johnson", a character in the film Fame, played by Gene Anthony Ray
"Bring Back That Leroy Brown", subject of a song by Queen
Leroy Encyclopedia Brown, the titular protagonist of the Encyclopedia Brown children's novels
Leroy (Lilo & Stitch), a character introduced in Leroy & Stitch
Leroy (South Park), a South Park character
Leroy Jethro Gibbs, a fictional character in the NCIS TV series
Leeroy Jenkins, World of Warcraft character
 The fictional Leroy family in the TV show Corner Gas:
Brent Herbert Leroy, one of the main characters in Corner Gas, played by Brent Butt
Emma Leroy, one of the main characters in Corner Gas, played by Janet Wright
Oscar Leroy, one of the main characters in Corner Gas, played by Eric Peterson
Leroy, a junkyard dog in the DIC show, The Catillac Cats.

See also
Leroi, given name and surname

References 

English masculine given names
Surnames of French origin
French-language surnames